Sanat is the third album by Finnish a cappella ensemble Rajaton, released in 2002. The word sanat means "words" in Finnish, and "heals" in Latin. The album consists of sacred Christian songs and features music in Finnish, Latin, English, and Medieval Irish.

Track listing
Title (composer / lyricist)
 Aurinkolaulu (Anna-Mari Kähärä / Mika Waltari)
 Were You There? (trad., arr. Mia Makaroff)
 Benedic anima mea Domino (Jaakko Mäntyjärvi / Psalm 102:1-5, 20-22)
 Stabat Mater (Kaj Chydenius / Jacopone Da Todi, Aale Tynni)
 Vain taivasta kukkaset katsovat (Jussi Chydenius / Aale Tynni)
 Kaikki maat, te riemuitkaatte (Mia Makaroff / Johann Franck)
 Iltavirsi (Armas Maasalo, Heikki Klemetti / Hilija Haahti, arr. Jarmo Saari)
 Tórramat Do Nóebaengil (Jaakko Mäntyjärvi / anon. Irish, 12th century)
 Nearer, My God, To Thee (Jussi Chydenius / Sarah Flower Adams)
 Didn't My Lord Deliver Daniel? (trad., arr. Mia Makaroff)
 Weary In Well-Doing (Anna-Mari Kähärä / Christina Rossetti)
 Pia Desideria (Hannu Lepola / Marjo Hakamäki)

External links
 official Rajaton website
 Rajaton - Sanat at Last.fm

Rajaton albums
2002 live albums
Musical settings of poems by Christina Rossetti